Uru-Pa-In is an isolated Tupi–Guaraní language of the state of Rondônia, in the Amazon region of Brazil. Speakers have no permanent contact with the outside world.

References

Tupi–Guarani languages
Unclassified languages of South America
Mamoré–Guaporé linguistic area